Dronamraju Satyanarayana (19 December 1933 – 2006) was an Indian politician and member of both Lok Sabha and Rajya Sabha in Indian Parliament.

Satyanarayana was born on 19 December 1933. His father was Appala Narasihmam.

He was elected to the 6th Lok Sabha from Visakhapatnam as a member of Indian National Congress (INC) in 1977.

He was elected to the Andhra Pradesh Legislative Assembly in 1980 and was Vice-President, Andhra Pradesh Congress Committee between 1987–94.

He served for two sessions as a member of the Rajya Sabha, between 1988–94 and 1994–2000.

He was the author of Gramodyog a history of village administration.

His son Dronamjaju Srinivas Rao is also an INC politician.

External links
 Biodata of Dronamraju Satyanarayana at Rajya Sabha website.

Telugu politicians
1933 births
2006 deaths
Rajya Sabha members from Andhra Pradesh
India MPs 1977–1979
Indian National Congress politicians from Andhra Pradesh
Lok Sabha members from Andhra Pradesh
People from Visakhapatnam district
People from Uttarandhra
Politicians from Visakhapatnam